Ryan Turnbull  (born July 15, 1977) is a Canadian Liberal Party politician and social innovation consultant who was elected to represent the riding of Whitby in the House of Commons of Canada in the 2019 Canadian federal election.

A member of the Liberal Party of Canada, he currently sits on the House of Commons Standing Committee on Human Resources, Skills and Social Development and the Status of Persons with Disabilities and the Standing Committee on Procedure and House Affairs.  He is also the chair of the Social Innovation Caucus, which is responsible for helping to build social enterprises—businesses that are owned by a nonprofit organization, and are directly involved in the production and/or selling of goods and services for the blended purpose of generating income and achieving social, cultural, and/or environmental aims.

Education and career
As a teenager, he took intensive leadership training which inspired him to dedicate his life to one of service to community. He went on to study philosophy and applied ethics for 8 years earning both a Bachelor's Degree (with high honours) and a Master's Degree from Carleton University.

He has taught, developed curriculum and overseen research at a number of post-secondary institutions, including Carleton University, Sogang University, University of London (St. Georges Medical School), Ryerson University and Durham College. He has also taught business ethics and corporate social responsibility at Ted Rogers School of Business Management for several years.

Turnbull founded a management consulting company focused on social innovation and ethics. His company, Eco-Ethonomics Inc. has managed more than 350 projects focused on employing social innovation methods to addressing complex and systemic problems like systemic poverty, racism, and gender equality.

Electoral record

References

External links

Living people
Liberal Party of Canada MPs
Members of the House of Commons of Canada from Ontario
People from Whitby, Ontario
21st-century Canadian politicians
1977 births